Jacquier is a French surname. Notable people with the surname include:

 Élodie Jacquier-Laforge (born 1978), French politician

François Jacquier (1711–1788), French mathematician
Gilles Jacquier (1968–2012), French journalist
Nicholas Jacquier (died 1472), French Dominican, Inquisitor and demonologist
Paul Jacquier (1879–1961), French politician

French-language surnames
Surnames of French origin